Mother's Day is a 1993 Austrian comedy film directed by Harald Sicheritz.

Cast 
 Alfred Dorfer - Mischa Neugebauer / Polizist Gratzl
 Reinhard Nowak - Edwin Neugebauer / Postler / Nachbarjunge 2
  - Trude Neugebauer / Postlerin / Jungscharbetreuerin
  - Evelyn Schöbinger / Kassiererin Haberl
 Roland Düringer - Opa Neugebauer / spitzbärtiger Nachbar /  Briefträger Zapletal /
 Karl Künstler - Herr Schwalbach
  - Frau Habitzl
  - Frau Klein 
 Gudrun Tielsch - Verwirrte
 Lukas Resetarits - Sandler
 Willi Resetarits - Thief

References

External links 

1993 films
1993 comedy films
Austrian comedy films
Mother's Day
1990s German-language films